Eslamabad (also Romanized as Eslāmābād) is a village in Golmakan Rural District, Golbajar District, Chenaran County, Razavi Khorasan Province, Iran. At the 2006 census, its population was 229, in 54 families.

References 

Populated places in Chenaran County